Calubian, officially the Municipality of Calubian, is a 4th class municipality in the province of Leyte, Philippines. According to the 2020 census, it has a population of 31,646 people.

History
On January 8, 1919, Governor Charles E. Yeater issued Executive Order No. 4, creating the town of Calubian which is formerly a barrio of the Municipality of Leyte, Leyte. Originally, its name was Eulalia in honor of a prominent lady resident. Later it was changed to Calubian due to the vast coconut plantation of the place (Photo shown is the Eulalia Monument located at the foot of the Veloso hill on the way to the Municipal Hall).

The Local Government of Calubian was formerly organized on January 22, 1919, with Felix Garganera as its first town executive. In 1922, he was succeeded by Nepumoceno Torlao, a generous resident of the locality. Then Alejandro Baronda took the reign as Local Chief Executive from 1931 to 1934. From 1934 to 1937, Felix Lafuente became the Town Chief followed by Francisco Enage in 1938 to 1940 and later on Enrique Q. Enage led the town from 1941 to 1942. They were followed by Lorenzo Mendoza from 1942 to 1944. Honorato Agas Sr led his people from 1945 to April 15, 1986, except for one term 1952-1953 when he was defeated by Rosendo Eamiguel, a popular landlord of Barangay Villalon.

The popular EDSA Revolution on February 25, 1986, brought an end to Agas’ term and Victorio Loygos Sr was eventually appointed as the OIC Mayor from April 16, 1986, to May 1987. Engr. Rolando R. Amparado succeeded him by appointment from June 24, 1987, to November 30, 1987, followed by Marciano Batiancela Jr from December 1, 1987, until the newly elected Local Chief Executive in the person of Dr. Carlos C. Cotiangco Jr. assumed office on February 8, 1988. He has done tremendous accomplishment in the Metro-Calubian by accomplishing several infrastructure projects such as concreting of municipal and barangay roads, public markets, waiting sheds, completion of municipal hall, improvement of the drainage system, multi-purpose pavements and water works projects.

Geography

Barangays
Calubian is politically subdivided into 53 barangays.

Climate

Demographics

Economy

Gallery

References

External links

 [ Philippine Standard Geographic Code]
Official website of the Municipality of Calubian
Local Governance Performance Management System

Municipalities of Leyte (province)